Susan Maria Blue, better known as Sue Blu, (born 12 July 1948) is an American voice-actress, voice-director, and casting-director in American and Canadian cinema and television. She most notably voiced Arcee in The Transformers: The Movie and Seasons 3 and 4 of The Transformers (she later reprised the role in Transformers: Animated). She is also known for playing the roles of Stormer/Mary Phillips and Lindsey Pierce in the 1980s animated series Jem. She also served as a Casting- & Voice-Director for Handy Manny, for which she also guest-starred as Marion.

Life and career
Blu graduated from Stephens College in Columbia, Missouri in 1968. Her voice roles include Nanny Smurf on The Smurfs, Judge J.B. McBride on BraveStarr, Jessica Wray, Futura and Belfry on Ghostbusters, Aimee Brightower on Galaxy High, Kim on Fangface, Hiccup on Little Clowns of Happytown, Lofty, Paradise, Buttons and other minor characters on My Little Pony, the character Transmutate in the episode of the same name of the series Beast Wars, and one of Petrie's brothers and sisters in The Land Before Time XII: The Great Day of the Flyers (2006). She also played Princess PawPaw on Hanna-Barbera's Paw Paws, the Sphinx on Tiny Toon Adventures, and provided the voice of Sibella from the television movie Scooby Doo and the Ghoul School (1988).

Blu has worked as a voice-director for the Ocean Group, a Canadian-based company most notable for providing the voice-actors for Viz Communications and Beast Wars series. She was the voice director for Beast Wars, a prequel (and sequel) of The Transformers, and the sequel, Beast Machines. She was the dialogue director on the Teenage Mutant Ninja Turtles 1987 TV series and is also the voice director on the Teenage Mutant Ninja Turtles 2003 TV series. She was the voice-director for Transformers: Animated and reprised the role of Arcee. She also played the role of Vikki Grimm from the Army Men series. She is also the voice director and voice actor for The Magic School Bus. She worked as voice director for Transformers: Prime until Season 1, Episode 7, when the death of her wife forced her to turn the position over to Jamie Simone.

Blu's on-screen appearances include an appearance on the 1977 television series Three's Company, an appearance on the television series Knight Rider, and the role of Amanda Shepard in Friday the 13th Part VII: The New Blood (1988).

Personal life
Blu is openly lesbian. Blu's domestic partner, actress Cynthia Songé, died in Arroyo Grande, California, on May 19, 2010. Prior to her death, Songé and Blu were the owners of Blupka Productions, Inc., a Los Angeles-based television and film voiceover school. They also were authors of the industry-related book, Word of Mouth... A Guide to Voiceover Excellence. .

In August 2013, Blu married girlfriend Tania Themmen in Stamford, Connecticut. Tania is the daughter of composer Ivana Marburger Themmen and the sister of actor Paris Themmen (who is best known for his role as Mike Teavee in Willy Wonka & the Chocolate Factory),

Filmography

Live-action television
 ABC Saturday Comedy Special (1976) – Archie (unsold pilot) – Midge
 The Archie Situation Comedy Musical Variety Show (TV special) (1978) – Midge
 The Wild Wild West Revisited (TV Movie) (1979) – Gabrielle

Single-episode roles in the following series
 Kojak
 The Brian Keith Show
 The Waltons
 Three's Company
 Whiz Kids
 St. Elsewhere
 Newhart
 Knight Rider (1982 series)
 Simon & Simon
 TUGS - Sally Seaplane (Only in test US dub)

Television animation
 The 13 Ghosts of Scooby-Doo — Flim Flam
 Aaahh!!! Real Monsters — Additional Voices
 American Dragon Jake Long — Jasmine as a Nix, Additional Voices
 Animal Crack-Ups — Reggie the Heggie
 Bigfoot and the Muscle Machines — Jennifer, Red, Redder
 Bionic Six — Ronnie Gordon
 BraveStarr — Judge J.B. McBride, Molly, Vipra, Commander Karen Kane, Additional Voices
 Captain Planet and the Planeteers — Additional Voices
 Chip 'n Dale Rescue Rangers — Additional Voices
 Clifford's Puppy Days — Lewis Sidarsky, Mrs. Solomon
 Clifford the Big Red Dog — Dan, Billy, Aunty Sandy
 Droopy, Master Detective — Additional Voices
 DuckTales (1987 series) — Additional Voices
 The Dukes — Additional Voices (Season 2)
 The Completely Mental Misadventures of Ed Grimley — Additional Voices
 Extreme Ghostbusters — Additional Voices
 Fangface — Kim
 Fantastic Max — Additional Voices
 The Flintstone Kids — Dreamchip Gemstone, Granite Janet
 Foofur — Dolly
 G.I. Joe: A Real American Hero — Additional Voices
 Galaxy High — Aimee Brightower
 Filmation's Ghostbusters — Jessica Wray, Futura, Belfry, Additional Voices
 Godzilla: The Series — Doctor #2
 Gravedale High — Additional Voices
 Handy Manny — Marion the Librarian
 The Incredible Hulk (1982 animated series) — Rita, Additional Voices
 Invasion America — Additional Voices
 Jackie Chan Adventures — Additional Voices
 James Bond Jr. — Additional Voices
 Jem — Lin-Z/Lindsay Pierce, Stormer/Mary Phillips
 The Jetsons — Additional Voices (1985)
 Jin Jin and the Panda Patrol — Additional Voices
 The Land Before Time — Additional Voices
 Lazer Tag Academy — Additional Voices
 Little Clowns of Happytown — Hiccup
 The Little Rascals — Additional Voices
 Madeline — Additional Voices
 The Magic School Bus — Additional Voices (including female producer)
 Monchichis — Additional Voices
 My Little Pony — Buttons, Paradise, Pluma
 The New Adventures of Zorro — Additional Voices
 New Kids on the Block — Additional Voices
 The New Yogi Bear Show — Additional Voices
 OK K.O.! Let's Be Heroes — Sibella the Vampire
 Paw Paws — Princess Paw Paw
 Popeye and Son — Shelley
 Richie Rich — Additional Voices
 Rise of the Teenage Mutant Ninja Turtles — Yokai Council Member
 The Scooby & Scrappy-Doo/Puppy Hour — Additional Voices
 The Simpsons — White Weasel, Howard
 The Smurfs — Nanny Smurf, Pansy
 Spider-Man and His Amazing Friends — Additional Voices
 Stanley, the Ugly Duckling — Stanley
 Star Fairies — Jazz
 The Tick (1994 animated series) — Suffra-Jet
 Tiny Toon Adventures — Sphinx
 Tom & Jerry Kids — Additional Voices
 Toxic Crusaders — Additional Voices
 The Transformers — Arcee, Marissa Faireborn, Beta
 Transformers: Animated — Arcee, Flareup
 Visionaries: Knights of the Magical Light — Galadria, Heskedor
 Where's Waldo? – Additional Voices
 Where on Earth Is Carmen Sandiego? — Additional Voices
 Wildfire — Brutus
 Yogi's Treasure Hunt — Additional Voices
 Zorro — Additional Voices

Film
 Rose Petal Place (1984) — Sunny Sunflower, Daffodil (voice)
 Rose Petal Place: Real Friends (1985) — Sunny Sunflower, Fuchsia, Canterbury Belle (voice)
 My Little Pony: The Movie (1986) — Lofty / Grundle / Bushwoolie #5 (voice)
 The Transformers: The Movie (1986) — Arcee (voice)
 Yogi's Great Escape (1987) — Buzzy, Little Cowgirl, Swamp Fox Girl, Swamp Fox Kids (voice)
 BraveStarr: The Movie (1988) — Judge J.B. McBride (voice)
 Scooby-Doo and the Ghoul School (1988) — Sibella the Vampire (voice)
 Yogi and the Invasion of the Space Bears (1988) — Snulu (voice)
 Friday the 13th Part VII: The New Blood (1988) — Amanda Shepard
 The Canterville Ghost (1988) — Virginia Otis (voice)
 Deadly Weapon (1989) — Shirley
 The Adventures of Ronald McDonald: McTreasure Island (1990) — Jimmy Hawkins (voice)
 The Hunchback of Notre Dame (1996) —  additional voices
 Grandma Got Run Over by a Reindeer (2000) — Grandma Spankenheimer (voice)
 Cinderella II: Dreams Come True (2002) — additional voices
 Finding Nemo (2003) — additional voices
 Cars (2006) — (voice)
 Clifford's Really Big Movie (2004) — (voice)
 The Land Before Time XII: The Great Day of the Flyers (2006) — Petrie's Siblings (voice)

Video games
 Army Men: Air Attack 2 — Vikki Grimm
 Army Men: Air Combat — The Elite Missions — Vikki Grimm, Lt. Felicity "Bombshell" Wannamaker
 Army Men: Sarge's Heroes — Vikki Grimm
 Army Men: Sarge's Heroes 2 — Vikki Grimm, Brigitte Bleu
 Portal Runner — Vikki Grimm

Crew work
 A.T.O.M. — Voice Casting and Dialogue Director
 All-New Dennis the Menace — Voice Director
 An American Tail: The Mystery of the Night Monster — Casting & Voice Director
 An American Tail: The Treasure of Manhattan Island — Casting & Voice Director
 Balto II: Wolf Quest — Casting & Voice Director
 Balto III: Wings of Change — Casting & Voice Director
 Barnyard Commandos — Dialogue Director
 Beast Machines — Voice Director
 Beast Wars — Voice Director
 Ben 10: Omniverse — Casting & Voice Director (78 episodes)
 Big Guy and Rusty the Boy Robot — Dialogue Director
 Buster & Chauncey's Silent Night — Voice Director
 Butt-Ugly Martians — Voice Director
 Capertown Cops — Voice Director
 Choose Your Own Adventure: The Abominable Snowman — Voice Director
 Clifford the Big Red Dog — Voice Director
 Clifford's Puppy Days – Voice Director
 Clifford's Really Big Movie — Voice Director
 Chucklewood Critters — Voice Director
 Cyberchase — Voice Director (Seasons 1-4 and 6-8)
 Curious George — Voice Director (Uncredited)
 Curious George — Casting & Voice Director (Seasons 1-9) (102 episodes)
 Curious George Swings Into Spring — Casting & Voice Director
 Curious George: A Halloween Boo Fest — Casting & Voice Director
 Curious George: A Very Monkey Christmas — Casting & Voice Director
 Curious George 2: Follow That Monkey! — Casting & Voice Director
 Curious George 3: Back to the Jungle — Casting & Voice Director
 Darkstalkers — Voice Director
 Dennis and Gnasher — Dialogue Director
 Dino Babies — Dialogue Director
 Dragon and Slippers — Voice Director
 Dragon Booster — Voice Director
 Dragons: Riders of Berk — Voice Director
 Extreme Ghostbusters — Dialogue Director
 Godzilla: The Series — Dialogue Director
 Grandma Got Run Over by a Reindeer — Voice Director
 Handy Manny — Casting & Voice Director (78 episodes)
 Heavy Gear: The Animated Series — Dialogue Director
 Invasion America — Casting & Voice Director
 Jackie Chan Adventures — Dialogue Director
 Jackie Chan Adventures (video game) — Dialogue Director
 James Bond Jr. — Dialogue Director
 Jumanji — Dialogue Director
 Kong: The Animated Series — Voice Director
 Legion of Super Heroes — Casting & Voice Director (Season 2)
 Little Orphan Annie's A Very Animated Christmas — Voice Director
 Lost in Oz — Casting & Voice Director
 Mama Mirabelle's Home Movies — Voice Director
 Max Steel — Dialogue Director
 Maya & Miguel — Voice Director
 Men in Black: The Series — Dialogue Director
 New Kids on the Block — Casting & Voice Director
 Open Season — Voice Director
 Richie Rich — Voice Director
 Robotech: The Shadow Chronicles — Casting & Voice Director
 Roswell Conspiracies: Aliens, Myths and Legends — Voice Director
 Roughnecks: Starship Troopers Chronicles — Dialogue Director
 Skeleton Warriors — Voice Director
 Snow White and the Magic Mirror — Dialogue Director
 Space Cats — Dialogue Director
 Special Agent Oso — Dialogue Director
 Spider-Man: The New Animated Series — Dialogue Director
 Superman: Brainiac Attacks — Casting & Voice Director
 Star Wars: The Clone Wars — Casting Services
 Stone Protectors — Voice Director
 Street Fighter — Voice Director
 Stuart Little: The Animated Series — Dialogue Director
 Stuart Little 3: Call of the Wild — Casting & Voice Director
 Surf's Up — Voice Director
 Teenage Mutant Ninja Turtles — Dialogue Director
 Teenage Mutant Ninja Turtles — Voice Director (seasons 1-5)
 The Adventures of Brer Rabbit — Casting & Voice Director
 The Adventures of Corduroy — Voice Director
 The Adventures of Hyperman — Voice Director
 The Adventures of Ronald McDonald: McTreasure Island — Casting & Voice Director
 The California Raisin Show — Dialogue Director
 The Fantastic Voyages of Sinbad the Sailor — Dialogue Director
 The Land Before Time — Casting & Voice Director
 The Land Before Time VI: The Secret of Saurus Rock — Casting & Voice Director
 The Land Before Time VII: The Stone of Cold Fire — Casting & Voice Director
 The Land Before Time VIII: The Big Freeze — Casting & Voice Director
 The Land Before Time IX: Journey to Big Water — Casting & Voice Director
 The Land Before Time X: The Great Longneck Migration — Casting & Voice Director
 The Land Before Time XI: Invasion of the Tinysauruses — Casting & Voice Director
 The Land Before Time XII: The Great Day of the Flyers — Casting & Voice Director
 The Land Before Time XIII: The Wisdom of Friends — Casting & Voice Director
 The Land Before Time XIV: Journey of the Brave — Casting & Voice Director
 The Life & Adventures of Santa Claus — Casting & Voice Director
 The Life and Times of Juniper Lee — Casting & Voice Director
 The Magic School Bus — Voice Director
 The Mummy: The Animated Series — Voice Director
 The New Adventures of He-Man — Voice Director
 The New Adventures of Zorro — Voice Director
 The Night of the Headless Horseman — Casting & Voice Director
 The Pirates Who Don't Do Anything: A VeggieTales Movie — Casting Director
 The Tick — Voice Director (ep. 1-6) and seasons 2-3
 The Twisted Tales of Felix the Cat — Voice Director
 The Wish That Changed Christmas — Voice Director
 The Wizard of Oz — Voice Director
 Toxic Crusaders — Dialogue Director
 Transformers Animated — Casting & Recording Director
 Transformers: Prime — Voice Director (ep. 1-11)
 TUGS — Voice Director (ep. "Sunshine") (Only in test US dub)
 T'was the Day Before Christmas — Voice Director
 Ultimate Book of Spells — Voice Director
 Vor-Tech: Undercover Conversion Squad — Voice Director
 Where's Waldo? — Casting & Voice Director
 Wing Commander Academy — Casting & Voice Director
 Zorro: Generation Z — Voice Director

References

External links
 
 

1948 births
Living people
Actresses from Saint Paul, Minnesota
American film actresses
American television actresses
American voice actresses
Hanna-Barbera people
American casting directors
Women casting directors
American voice directors
American lesbian actresses
LGBT people from Minnesota
21st-century American women
Year of birth missing (living people)